Song Zhenyu (Pinyin: Sòng Zhènyú) (born September 21, 1981) is a Chinese former footballer who played as a goalkeeper.

Club career
Despite being born in Dalian, Liaoning Song Zhenyu would move to Chengdu in the Sichuan province as a boy where he achieved his dream in becoming a professional footballer when he joined top-tier side Sichuan Quanxing in 1999. For the next two seasons he played understudy to Gao Jianbin and made thirteen league appearances during the periods that Gao Jianbin was injured; however, being unable to permanently claim the first-choice goalkeeping position, Song was loaned out to Chongqing Lifan and his hometown football team Dalian Shide. After his loan period expired with Dalian Shide the club would decide to make a permanent move for Song where he played understudy to An Qi and made nine league appearances.

At the beginning of the 2005 league season Song rejoined his first club Sichuan Quanxing (who had renamed themselves Sichuan Guancheng) and immediately became the team's first-choice goalkeeper and helped guide the club to a ninth-place finish at the end of the season; however this wasn't enough for Sichuan in stopping them disbanding the team. In the 2006 league season Song moved to Shenyang Ginde where he rose to prominence by becoming their first choice goalkeeper. The following season would see him continue his establishment within the team despite the club's decision to move to Changsha and rename themselves Changsha Ginde. In 2008 Song became his country's first choice goalkeeper, then he tended to his wife while she battled and recovered from a brain tumor while also having to help guide Changsha Ginde away from relegation at the end of the season.

By the 2010 league season Song proclaimed his desire to move back to Chengdu with his wife while she gave birth to their child and wanted to join second-tier football team Chengdu Blades. He got his wish when he joined Chengdu Blades on the final day of the transfer deadline and played in twenty-four league games in their successful promotion push to the Chinese Super League. Chengdu Blades would however struggle in the top tier and after a heavy 4-1 defeat to Shanghai Shenhua, Song as well several other first team players would be dropped from the team. Halfway through the league season he joined Tianjin Teda F.C. for 1.5 million RMB where he established himself as the first choice goalkeeper and won the 2011 Chinese FA Cup in his debut season.

On 27 February 2017, Song transferred to China League Two side Shaanxi Chang'an Athletic.

Song retired after the 2021 season.

International career
Song Zhenyu would be called up to the Chinese senior team in 2007 after recently appointed manager Vladimir Petrović decided he was looking for a new goalkeeper. He would fight for the goalkeeping position against Zong Lei and would eventually make his first full international cap for China against Mexico on April 16, 2008 in a 1-0 defeat. Under Petrović's reign Song would become his countries first choice goalkeeper until Gao Hongbo became the Chinese new manager and decided to drop Song from the squad.

Career statistics

Honours

Club
Tianjin Teda F.C.
Chinese FA Cup: 2011

References

External links

Player stats at Sohu.com

1981 births
Living people
Chinese footballers
Footballers from Dalian
China international footballers
Sichuan Guancheng players
Chongqing Liangjiang Athletic F.C. players
Dalian Shide F.C. players
Changsha Ginde players
Chengdu Tiancheng F.C. players
Tianjin Jinmen Tiger F.C. players
Changchun Yatai F.C. players
Shaanxi Chang'an Athletic F.C. players
Chinese Super League players
China League One players
China League Two players
Association football goalkeepers